The white-eared ground sparrow (Melozone leucotis) is a large American sparrow which occurs locally in Middle America, mostly in foothills, from southern Mexico and Guatemala to northern Costa Rica. 

The nest, built by the female, is a massive bowl of stems, twigs and other plant material constructed on the ground or less than  up, and hidden amongst banana plants, orchids or similar cover. The female lays two brown-blotched white eggs, which she incubates for 12–14 days. The male helps in feeding the chicks.

The adult has a stubby dark-grey bill and unstreaked olive-brown upperparts. The head is mainly black with a broken white eye ring and white patches in front of and behind the eye. The nape is green and the sides of the neck are bright yellow. The throat and breast patch are black, separated by a thin rufous-grey line, and the rest of the underparts are mainly white with grey on the flanks. Young birds have yellower underparts, and a duller indistinct head pattern.

North Nicaragua birds, M. l. nigrior, have a much broader black breast spot than the nominate Costa Rican form, and the northernmost of the three subspecies, M. l. occipitalis, has a grey crown stripe, obvious yellow supercilium, and very small breast spot.

White-eared ground sparrow calls include a thin tsip. The male's song is an explosive whistled spit-CHUR see-see-see.

The white-eared ground sparrow feeds on the ground on seeds, fallen berries, insects and spiders. It is usually in pairs, and is a shy species best seen at near or dusk, although easier to find than its skulking relative, Prevost's ground sparrow.

References

External links

 
 Stamp (for El Salvador) at bird-stamps.org
 Pájaros de Costa Rica [Birds of Costa Rica] 
 
 
 

white-eared ground sparrow
Birds of Mexico
Birds of Guatemala
Birds of El Salvador
Birds of Nicaragua
Birds of Costa Rica
white-eared ground sparrow